Samuel Hunt (July 8, 1765 – July 7, 1807) was a U.S. Representative from New Hampshire.

Born in Charlestown, New Hampshire, Hunt completed preparatory studies, then studied law and was admitted to the bar in 1790, commencing practice in Alstead. He moved to Keene the same year and in 1795 abandoned the practice of law.  He returned to Charlestown and engaged in agricultural pursuits. He served as member of the New Hampshire House of Representatives in 1802 and 1803.

Hunt was elected as a Federalist to the Seventh Congress to fill the vacancy caused by the resignation of Joseph Peirce. He was reelected to the Eighth Congress and served from December 6, 1802, to March 3, 1805. He was an unsuccessful candidate for renomination in 1804.

Subsequently, Hunt founded a colony in Ohio. He died in Gallipolis, July 7, 1807, and was interred in Mound Cemetery, Marietta, Ohio.

References

1765 births
1807 deaths
People from Charlestown, New Hampshire
Federalist Party members of the United States House of Representatives from New Hampshire